Eero Urho Juhani Karhumäki (born 1949) is a Finnish mathematician
and theoretical computer scientist
known for his contributions to automata theory.
He is a professor at the University of Turku.

Biography

Karhumäki earned his doctorate from the University of Turku in 1976.
In 1980–1985, he was a junior researcher of Academy of Finland.
Since 1986, he has held teaching positions at the University of Turku,
attaining full professorship in 1998.
In 1998–2015,
Karhumäki was the head of the mathematics department at the University of Turku.
He has authored altogether around 200 research papers.

Karhumäki is a member of the Finnish Academy of Science and Letters since 2000
and of Academia Europaea since 2006.
A festschrift in his honour was published in 2009
as a special issue of Theoretical Computer Science.

Research contributions

Karhumäki has been a member of the Lothaire group of mathematicians
that developed the foundations of combinatorics of words. In 1991, jointly with Tero Harju, he solved the long-standing equivalence problem for multitape finite automata in automata theory.
Karhumäki contributed to different areas of formal language theory, such as word equations,
language equations
and descriptional complexity of finite automata.

References

External links
 
 

Finnish mathematicians
Finnish computer scientists
University of Turku alumni
Members of Academia Europaea
Members of the Finnish Academy of Science and Letters
People from Turku
Living people
1949 births
Theoretical computer scientists